Ilias Stavropoulos (born on 6 April 1995) is a Greek professional footballer who plays as a winger for Football League 2 club Olympiakos Kymina.

Club career

Aris
He started his career in youth teams of Aris. During the 2013–2014 season, he was promoted him to the first team, by manager Zoran Milinković. As of October 2013 he is member of Greece's U19 national team after he was chosen from Kostas Tsanas, head of the U19 team.

Olympiakos Kymina
Ahead of the 2019–20 season, Stavropoulos joined Olympiakos Kymina.

Career statistics

References

External links
 
Myplayer.gr Profile

1995 births
Living people
Greek footballers
Association football forwards
Super League Greece players
Aris Thessaloniki F.C. players
Episkopi F.C. players
Omonia Aradippou players
Cypriot Second Division players
Expatriate footballers in Cyprus
Greek expatriate footballers
Greek expatriates in Cyprus
Footballers from Thessaloniki